Live at Woodstock may refer to:

 Live at Woodstock (Jimi Hendrix album)
 Live at Woodstock (Creedence Clearwater Revival album)
 Live at Woodstock (DMX album)
 Live at Woodstock (Joe Cocker album)